The University of Florida Athletic Hall of Fame includes over 300 former Florida Gators athletes who represented the University of Florida in one or more intercollegiate sports and were recognized as "Gator Greats" for their athletic excellence during their college sports careers. The University of Florida, located in Gainesville, Florida, is a member of the Southeastern Conference (SEC), and fields twenty-one intercollegiate sports teams, all of which compete in Division I of the National Collegiate Athletic Association (NCAA).

Gator Greats are listed below in alphabetical order within each sport. Those listed include athletes from nine men's sports and nine women's sports. This list also includes "Distinguished Letterwinners", who are former Gators athletes who achieved distinction after graduation, as athletic coaches or administrators, professional athletes, or in public service or other career activities; and "Honorary Letterwinners," who were not former Gators athletes, but who distinguished themselves by their significant contributions to the success of the Florida Gators sports teams, including former championship Gators coaches. Distinguished Letterwinners and Honorary Letterwinners are listed below in alphabetical order in separate sections near the end of this article.

The Hall of Fame's Class of 2013 included Gator Greats Jeff Davis (wrestling), Josh Fogg (baseball), Rex Grossman (football), Riko Higashio (women's golf), Heather Mitts (women's soccer), Mike Pearson (football), and Chrissy Van Fleet (women's gymnastics); Honorary Letterwinner Ernestine Weaver (women's gymnastics coach); and Distinguished Letterwinner Larry Morris (football). The Class of 2014 included Gator Greats Aury Cruz (volleyball), Jenny Gladding (softball), Justin O'Neal (men's tennis), Keiwan Ratliff (football), Colleen Rosensteel (women's track and field), Mike Stanley (baseball) and Sarah Yohe (women's soccer), and Distinguished Letterwinner Harry Wilder (men's swimming).

The Class of 2015 included seven Gator Greats: Camilo Benedetti (men's golf), Matt Bonner (men's basketball), Beth Farmer (women's cross country; women's track and field), Nicole McCray (volleyball), Candice Scott (women's track and field), Camilo Villegas (men's golf), and Stephanie Zunich Donley (women's swimming). They were inducted on April 10, 2015.

Baseball 

The following Gator Greats are former members of the Florida Gators baseball team:

Men's basketball 

The following Gator Greats are former members of the Florida Gators men's basketball team:

Women's basketball 

The following Gator Greats are former members of the Florida Gators women's basketball team:

Boxing 

The following Gator Greats are former members of the Florida Gators men's boxing team:

Football 

The following Gator Greats are former members of the Florida Gators football team:

Men's golf 

The following Gator Greats are former members of the Florida Gators men's golf team:

Women's golf 

The following Gator Greats are former members of the Florida Gators women's golf team:

Women's gymnastics 

The following Gator Greats are former members of the Florida Gators women's gymnastics team:

Women's soccer 

The following Gator Greats are former members of the Florida Gators women's soccer team:

Softball 

The following Gator Great is a former member of the Florida Gators softball team:

Men's swimming and diving 

The following Gator Greats are former male members of the Florida Gators swimming and diving teams:

Women's swimming and diving 

The following Gator Greats are former female members of the Florida Gators swimming and diving teams:

Men's tennis 

The following Gator Greats are former members of the Florida Gators men's tennis team:

Women's tennis 

The following Gator Greats are former members of the Florida Gators women's tennis team:

Men's track and field 

The following Gator Greats are former male members of the Florida Gators track and field teams:

Women's track and field 

The following Gator Greats are former female members of the Florida Gators track and field teams:

Women's volleyball 

The following Gator Greats are former members of the Florida Gators volleyball team:

Wrestling 

The following Gator Greats are former members of the Florida Gators wrestling team:

Distinguished Letterwinners 

The following list of Distinguished Letterwinners includes former Florida Gators athletes who have achieved distinction in their careers after college; among them are notable head coaches, political officeholders, business executives, and educators.

Honorary Letterwinners 

The following list of Honorary Letterwinners includes former coaches whose Florida Gators teams won national championships, one who later became the Chief Justice of the Florida Supreme Court, another who later served as the U.S. Army four-star general commanding United Nations armed forces during the Korean War, and the university medical researcher who formulated the sports drink Gatorade.

See also 

 Fergie Ferguson Award
 Florida Gators
 Florida Sports Hall of Fame
 Gator Football Ring of Honor
 History of the University of Florida
 List of Florida Gators baseball players in Major League Baseball
 List of Florida Gators football All-Americans
 List of Florida Gators in the NFL Draft
 List of Florida Gators in the NBA
 List of Florida Gators men's golfers on the PGA Tour
 List of Florida Gators in the WNBA
 List of Florida Gators women's golfers on the LPGA Tour
 List of Florida Gators tennis players
 List of University of Florida alumni
 List of University of Florida Olympians
 University Athletic Association

Footnotes

References

Bibliography 

  Florida Baseball 2014 Media Supplement, University Athletic Association, Gainesville, Florida (2014).
  Florida Football 2014 Media Guide, University Athletic Association, Gainesville, Florida (2014).
  Florida Gymnastics 2014 Media Supplement, University Athletic Association, Gainesville, Florida (2014).
  Florida Men's Basketball 2013–14 Media Guide, University Athletic Association, Gainesville, Florida (2013).
  Florida Men's Golf 2013–14 Media Supplement, University Athletic Association, Gainesville, Florida (2013).
  Florida Men's Tennis 2013–14 Media Supplement, University Athletic Association, Gainesville, Florida (2013).
  Florida Soccer 2014 Media Supplement, University Athletic Association, Gainesville, Florida (2014).
  Florida Softball 2014 Media Supplement, University Athletic Association, Gainesville, Florida (2014).
  Florida Swimming & Diving 2013–14 Media Supplement, University Athletic Association, Gainesville, Florida (2013).
  Florida Volleyball 2013 Media Supplement, University Athletic Association, Gainesville, Florida (2013).
  Florida Women's Basketball 2013–14 Media Supplement, University Athletic Association, Gainesville, Florida (2013).
  Florida Women's Golf 2013–14 Media Supplement, University Athletic Association, Gainesville, Florida (2013).
  Florida Women's Tennis 2013–14 Media Supplement, University Athletic Association, Gainesville, Florida (2013).
 McEwen, Tom, The Gators: A Story of Florida Football, The Strode Publishers, Huntsville, Alabama (1974). .

External links 

 University of Florida Athletic Hall of Fame – Official webpage maintained by the F Club, the University of Florida lettermen's association.
  GatorZone.com – Official website of the Florida Gators sports program.

Florida
Athletic Hall
University of Florida
 Hall of Fame